Something in the Air is the second album from American country music singer Lila McCann. Her second and final album for Asylum Records, it was released in 1999 and it achieved RIAA gold certification. Four of its singles entered the Billboard Hot Country Singles & Tracks (now Hot Country Songs) charts: "With You" (#9), "Crush" (#41), "I Will Be" (#47) and "Kiss Me Now" (#41); "With You" was also a hit on the Billboard Hot 100 peaking at number 41, and became her first and only song to chart in the U.S.. "You're Gone" was originally slated as the album's first single, but was not released.

Track listing

Personnel

 Mike Brignardello - bass guitar
 Larry Byrom - acoustic guitar
 Eric Darken - percussion
 Stuart Duncan - fiddle
 Paul Franklin - steel guitar
 Sonny Garrish - steel guitar
 Vince Gill - background vocals
 Rob Hajacos - fiddle
 Aubrey Haynie - fiddle
 John Hobbs - piano
 Dann Huff - electric guitar
 Paul Leim - drums
 B. James Lowry - nylon string guitar
 Lila McCann - lead vocals, background vocals
 Terry McMillan - harmonica
 Liana Manis - background vocals
 Steve Nathan - keyboards, piano
 Tim Pierce - electric guitar
 Mark Spiro - background vocals
 Steve Wariner - background vocals
 Bryan White - background vocals
 Dennis Wilson - background vocals
 Lonnie Wilson - drums
 Curtis Young - background vocals

Charts

Weekly charts

Year-end charts

Notes

External links 
 Review at Country Standard Time

1999 albums
Asylum Records albums
Lila McCann albums